Balarampur College, established in 1985, is the general degree college in Rangadih, Balarampur, Purulia district. It offers undergraduate courses in arts, commerce. It is affiliated to Sidho Kanho Birsha University.

Departments

Science

Mathematics
Chemistry, Physics, Botany, Zoology

Arts and Commerce

Bengali
English
History
Geography
Political Science
Philosophy
Commerce

Accreditation
The college is recognized by the University Grants Commission (UGC).

See also

References

External links 
 
Sidho Kanho Birsha University
University Grants Commission
National Assessment and Accreditation Council

Colleges affiliated to Sidho Kanho Birsha University
Educational institutions established in 1985
Academic institutions formerly affiliated with the University of Burdwan
Universities and colleges in Purulia district
1985 establishments in West Bengal